Sudden Strike 4 is a real-time tactics video game set in World War II. It is the fifth game in the Sudden Strike series and the fourth standalone release. It is the first game developed by Kite Games, a collaboration of industry veteran game developers. Originally, it was scheduled to be released for PC and PlayStation 4 on June 27, 2017, but was delayed until August 11 and 15, for PC and PlayStation 4, respectively.

Gameplay
The single-player mode features 3 campaigns (German, Allied or Soviet) with over 20 missions and modding support is planned. Each of the missions in the different campaigns are based on real life World War II battles/invasions. For example, in the German campaign the player commands the Wehrmacht in the Battle of France, Operation Barbarossa, the Battle of Stalingrad, the Battle of Kursk and the Battle of the Bulge. The Invasion of Poland is used as a tutorial for the game and also acts as a prelude to the German campaign. Post-release DLCs features additional campaigns set in other theatres such as North African campaign, Winter and Continuation War, Battle of Dunkirk and Pacific War.

Strategy is heavily based on those of its predecessors with a focus on the unique characteristics and skills of limited units instead of resource gathering and base building. Reinforcements will still play a role in the game, but they are scripted and predictable. The game will also introduce skill trees and commander roles with famous World War II generals such as George Patton, Heinz Guderian, Bernard Montgomery, Omar Bradley or Georgy Zhukov.

Reception
Sudden Strike 4 received mixed reviews from critics upon release. On Metacritic, the PC version of the game holds a score of 70/100 based on 16 reviews and the PlayStation 4 version holds a score of 63/100 based on 12 reviews.

References

2017 video games
Real-time strategy video games
Real-time tactics video games
Video games developed in Hungary
Video games set in Belgium
Video games set in Egypt
Video games set in Finland
Video games set in France
Video games set in Germany
Video games set in Hungary
Video games set in Japan
Video games set in Libya
Video games set in Myanmar
Video games set in the Netherlands
Video games set in the Northern Mariana Islands
Video games set in Okinawa Prefecture
Video games set in the Philippines
Video games set in Poland
Video games set in Russia
Video games set in Singapore
Video games set in the Solomon Islands
Video games set in the Soviet Union
Video games set in Tunisia
Video games set in the United States
Pacific War video games
Linux games
MacOS games
PlayStation 4 games
Windows games
Xbox One games